Daniele Gragnoli (born 3 January 1994) is an Italian professional footballer who plays Lanciano.

Biography
Born in Rome, capital of Lazio region as well as the capital of whole Italy, Gragnoli was a youth product of S.S. Lazio. However, he was released during 2005–06 season.

Ascoli Picchio
After leaving Lazio, Gragnoli became a member of Ascoli Calcio's youth teams. During 2009–10 season, he was the member of under-17 team in National "Allievi" League. From 2010 to 2013 Gragnoli had played 29 games in the reserve league – Campionato Nazionale Primavera. He also made his Serie B debut on 25 August 2012 against Varese, the first round of 2012–13 Serie B. He was a late substitute for Yonese Hanine. In the whole season he made 3 Serie B appearances.

Parma
On 27 June 2013 Gragnoli was signed by Parma in co-ownership deal in 5-year contract, with Emiliano Storani moved to opposite direction also in co-ownership. Both 50% registration rights of the players were valued €1.6 million. Gragnoli also returned to the city of Ascoli Picchio on 31 July, joining Mirko Ronchi who signed by Parma on 30 July but immediately returned to Ascoli. It also revealed that Ascoli had apparently break-even again (€147,877) and positive net asset (€1,050,445) due to the €3.2 million selling revenue of Gragnoli on 30 June 2013, despite the audit report was rejected.

Gragnoli made 10 more league appearances for Ascoli Picchio in 2013–14 Lega Pro Prima Divisione. Gragnoli also played for the reverse team (under-19 team) as overage player.

During that season, the club, Ascoli Calcio 1898 SpA was declared bankrupted on 17 December 2013, by the court of Ascoli Picchio. The court also estimated the residual value of the assets were €862,000, which the residual value of the players contract such as Storani as well as the value of retained registration rights, such as Gragnoli and Ronchi were valued zero instead of valuing them by flopped historical values. In February 2014 the assets were takeover by the only bid from Ascoli Picchio FC 1898 SpA.

On 20 June 2014 new Ascoli sold Gragnoli, Di Gennaro and Pasqualini to Parma outright, as well as Parma bought back Colomba and Tamási (on 1 July); Ascoli bought Bright Addae from Parma on 18 July in definitive deal; Di Gennaro and Ronchi also signed by Ascoli in temporary deals on 20 June.

On 30 August 2014 he was signed by Slovenian club ND Gorica in temporary deal. On 2 February 2015 the loan of Gragnoli and Modolo were terminated.

International career
Gragnoli played all 3 games of 2011 UEFA European Under-17 Championship elite round.

References

External links
 Lega Serie B profile 
 AIC profile (data by football.it) 
 Slovenian Prvaliga profile 
 

Italian footballers
Ascoli Calcio 1898 F.C. players
Parma Calcio 1913 players
ND Gorica players
S.S. Virtus Lanciano 1924 players
Slovenian PrvaLiga players
Serie B players
Serie C players
Serie D players
Italian expatriate footballers
Expatriate footballers in Slovenia
Italian expatriate sportspeople in Slovenia
Italy youth international footballers
Association football forwards
Footballers from Rome
1994 births
Living people